Qaleh Now or Qaleh-ye Now or Qaleh Nau or Qaleh-i-Nau, also rendered as Qalehno, may refer to:

Afghanistan
 Qal`eh-ye Now, a village in Afghanistan

Iran

Fars Province
 Qaleh Now, Darab, a village in Darab County
 Qaleh Now, Hashivar, a village in Darab County
 Qaleh Now, Kavar, a village in Kavar County
 Qaleh-ye Now-e Mozaffari, a village in Kavar County
 Qaleh Now, Kharameh, a village in Kharameh County
 Qaleh Now, Mamasani, a village in Mamasani County
 Qaleh-ye Now, Marvdasht, a village in Marvdasht County
 Qaleh Now, Kamfiruz, a village in Marvdasht County
 Qaleh Now, Sepidan, a village in Sepidan County
 Qaleh Now, Bid Zard, a village in Shiraz County
 Qaleh-i-Nau, Derak, a village in Shiraz County
 Qaleh Now, Kaftarak, a village in Shiraz County

Hamadan Province
 Qaleh Now, Malayer, a village in Malayer County
 Qaleh Now, Tuyserkan, a village in Tuyserkan County

Hormozgan Province
 Qaleh Now, Hormozgan, a village in Hajjiabad County

Isfahan Province
 Qaleh Now, Isfahan, a village in Lenjan County

Kerman Province
 Qaleh Now, Arzuiyeh, a village in Arzuiyeh County
 Qaleh Now, Bam, a village in Bam County
 Qaleh-ye Now, Jiroft, a village in Jiroft County
 Qaleh Now, Jebalbarez, a village in Jiroft County

Khuzestan Province
 Qaleh Now-e Khalil, a village in Dezful County
 Qaleh Now Shamsabad, a village in Dezful County
 Qaleh Now, Omidiyeh, a village in Omidiyeh County

Lorestan Province
 Qaleh Now, Lorestan, a village in Khorramabad County, Lorestan Province, Iran
 Qaleh Now-ye Hakim, a village in Borujerd County, Lorestan Province, Iran
 Qaleh Now-ye Showkati, a village in Borujerd County, Lorestan Province, Iran

Markazi Province
 Qaleh-ye Now, Arak, a village in Arak County, Markazi Province, Iran
 Qaleh Now, Khomeyn, a village in Khomeyn County, Markazi Province, Iran
 Qaleh Now, alternate name of Hajjiabad, Khomeyn, a village in Khomeyn County, Markazi Province, Iran
 Qaleh Now, Shazand, a village in Shazand County, Markazi Province, Iran
 Qaleh Now, alternate name of Gunestan, a village in Shazand County, Markazi Province, Iran

North Khorasan Province
 Qaleh Now-ye Anqolabi, a village in Esfarayen County, North Khorasan Province, Iran
 Qaleh Now, Maneh and Samalqan, a village in Maneh and Samalqan County, North Khorasan Province, Iran

Razavi Khorasan Province
 Qaleh Now-e Shamlu, a village in Bakharz County
 Qaleh Now, Chenaran, a village in Chenaran County
 Qaleh Now-e Kahu, a village in Chenaran County
 Qaleh Now-ye Fariman, a village in Fariman County
 Qaleh-ye Now, Joghatai, a village in Joghatai County
 Qaleh-ye Now, Jowayin, a village in Jowayin County
 Qaleh Now, Kalat, a village in Kalat County
 Qaleh-ye Now, Khvaf, a village in Khvaf County
 Qaleh Now, Mahvelat, a village in Mahvelat County
 Qaleh Now-e Kalateh Menar, a village in Mashhad County
 Qaleh Now-e Valiabad, a village in Mashhad County
 Qaleh Now, Nishapur, a village in Nishapur County
 Qaleh Now, alternate name of Gardan, a village in Nishapur County
 Qaleh Now-ye Alireza Bek, a village in Nishapur County
 Qaleh Now-e Jamshid, a village in Nishapur County
 Qaleh Now-ye Mehdiabad, a village in Nishapur County
 Qaleh Now-e Naimabad, a village in Nishapur County
 Qaleh Now, Sarakhs, a village in Sarakhs County
 Qaleh Now-e Abgheh, a village in Taybad County
 Qaleh Now, Torbat-e Heydarieh, a village in Torbat-e Heydarieh County
 Qaleh Now-e Mastufi, a village in Torbat-e Heydarieh County
 Qaleh Now-ye Safiabad, a village in Zaveh County

Semnan Province
 Qaleh Now-e Kharaqan, a village in Shahrud County, Semnan Province, Iran
 Qaleh Now-e Khaleseh, Semnan, a village in Shahrud County, Semnan Province, Iran

South Khorasan Province
 Qaleh Now, South Khorasan, a village in Darmian County, South Khorasan Province, Iran

Tehran Province
 Qaleh Now-e Amlak, a village in Pakdasht County, Tehran Province, Iran
 Qaleh Now, Pishva, a village in Pishva County, Tehran Province, Iran
 Qaleh Now, Shahriar, a village in Shahriar County, Tehran Province, Iran
 Qaleh Now, Varamin, a village in Varamin County, Tehran Province, Iran
 Qaleh-ye Now-e Fashapuyeh, a village in Rey County, Tehran Province, Iran
 Qaleh-ye Now Chaman Zamin, a village in Rey County, Tehran Province, Iran
 Qaleh Now-e Hajji Musa, a village in Tehran County, Tehran Province, Iran
 Qaleh Now-e Khaleseh, Tehran, a village in Tehran County, Tehran Province, Iran
 Qaleh Now Rural District